Voice is a 2001 solo album by Journey guitarist Neal Schon.  The album features instrumental versions of popular songs. It peaked at number 15 on Billboard's Top New Age album chart in the same year. In 2002, Voice was nominated for a Grammy Award for Best Pop Instrumental Album.

Track listing
 "Caruso" (feat. David Foster) (Lucio Dalla) (Produced by David Foster)
 "Hero" (Mariah Carey)
 "(Everything I Do) I Do It for You" (Bryan Adams)
 "Killing Me Softly" (Roberta Flack)
 "From This Moment On" (Shania Twain)
 "Why" (Annie Lennox)
 "I Can't Make You Love Me" (Bonnie Raitt)
 "Time to Say Goodbye (Con te partiro)" (Andrea Bocelli)
 "My Heart Will Go On" (Céline Dion)
 "A Song for You" (feat. David Foster)  (Leon Russell) (Produced by David Foster)

Personnel
Neal Schon - guitar
Gary Cirimelli - acoustic guitar, keyboards, programming
Scott Fuller - keyboards

References

2001 albums
Neal Schon albums
Higher Octave albums
New-age albums by American artists